Linda Lopez (born 1968) is an American attorney serving as a United States district judge of the United States District Court for the Southern District of California. She previously served as a magistrate judge of the same court.

Early life and education 
The child of Cuban immigrants, Lopez was born in Miami, Florida and raised in the nearby suburb of Hialeah. She earned an Associate of Arts in and Associate of Science degree from Miami Dade College, a Bachelor of Arts from Florida International University in 1996, and a Juris Doctor from the University of Miami School of Law in 1999.

Career 
Lopez began her career as a criminal defense attorney in Florida, working both at a firm and as a solo practitioner. In 2007, she relocated to San Diego, where she joined the Office of the Federal Public Defender as a senior trial attorney.

United States magistrate judge 
Lopez was sworn in as a magistrate judge for the Southern District of California on October 26, 2018.

District court service 
On September 30, 2021, President Joe Biden nominated Lopez to be a United States district judge of the United States District Court for the Southern District of California. President Biden nominated Lopez to the seat vacated by Judge Roger Benitez, who assumed senior status on December 31, 2017. On November 3, 2021, a hearing on her nomination was held before the Senate Judiciary Committee. On December 2, 2021, her nomination was reported out of committee by a 12–10 vote. On December 17, 2021, the United States Senate invoked cloture on her nomination by a 47–30 vote. Her nomination was confirmed later that day by a 48–25 vote. She received her judicial commission on December 21, 2021.

See also
 List of Hispanic/Latino American jurists

References

External links 

1968 births
Living people
20th-century American women lawyers
20th-century American lawyers
21st-century American judges
21st-century American women lawyers
21st-century American lawyers
21st-century American women judges
American judges of Cuban descent
California lawyers
Florida International University alumni
Florida lawyers
Hispanic and Latino American judges
Hispanic and Latino American lawyers
Judges of the United States District Court for the Southern District of California
Lawyers from San Diego
Miami Dade College alumni
People from Miami Beach, Florida
Public defenders
United States district court judges appointed by Joe Biden
United States magistrate judges
University of Miami School of Law alumni